The Devil's Game is a novel by Poul Anderson published in 1980.

Plot summary
The Devil's Game is a novel in which seven people are brought together to play a high stakes game.

Reception
Greg Costikyan reviewed The Devil's Game in Ares Magazine #6 and commented that "Anderson certainly has not let himself stagnate; indeed, his metamorphosis is all the more striking in a writer of settled style. It is to be devoutly desired that The Devil's Game receives the attention it deserves from the mainstream audience."

Reviews
Review by Tom Easton (1981) in Analog Science Fiction/Science Fact, March 30, 1981 
Review by Theodore Sturgeon (1981) in Rod Serling's The Twilight Zone Magazine, June 1981 
Review by Keith Soltys (1986) in Fantasy Review, January 1986

References

1980 American novels
American science fiction novels
Novels by Poul Anderson